Expeditus (died 303) also known as Expedite, was said to have been a Roman centurion in Armenia who was martyred around April 303 in what is now Turkey, for converting to Christianity. Considered the patron saint of urgent causes, he is also known as the saint of time, he was commemorated by the Catholic Church on 19 April.

Hagiography 
Expeditus was probably born in Armenia. He was a Christian martyr, but not much else is known about him. Information concerning Expeditus is found in the Hieronymian Martyrology, where he appears as one of six Roman soldiers said to have been executed at Melitene during the Diocletianic Persecution. If he was stationed at Melitene at the beginning of the fourth century, he would likely have been a member of the Legio XII Fulminata.

The earliest indication of devotion to St. Expeditus comes only from the second half of the eighteenth century. He was mentioned briefly in 1675 in the Acta sanctorum volume for April. However, according to Delehaye, the word "Expeditus" is a misreading of "Elpidius". The name "Expeditus" has provoked puns, so he has become the saint of rapidity.  At first, he was invoked for urgent causes; he has since become the patron of dealers, sailors, students, and examinees; he is also implored for success in lawsuits.

Given that "Expeditus" is Latin for a soldier without marching pack, i.e. a soldier with light equipment, this saint may be an anonymous individual known by his profession. His cult was already developed in Turin, Italy, in the Middle Ages.

Roman Catholic veneration

Legends 
According to tradition, Expeditus was a Roman centurion in Armenia who became a Christian and was beheaded during the Diocletian Persecution in AD 303. The day he decided to become a Christian, the Devil took the form of a crow (a snake in some versions of the legend) and told him to defer his conversion until the next day. Expeditus stamped on the bird and killed it, declaring, "I'll be a Christian today!"

Expeditus was included in martyrologies in Italy before 1781. There was a tradition that Expeditus could be called upon to help settle overly long legal cases. His feast of April 19 is widely celebrated. Expedite is venerated in Europe and strongly in Latin America. Brazil has ceremonies in São Paulo and crowds attending ceremonies to mark his April 19 feast day can reach in the hundreds of thousands.

Many stories circulated about the origin of the cultus of Expeditus. One states that it began when a package marked expedite (meaning 'be ready' or alternately 'loosen') arrived with unidentified relics or statues. The recipients assumed that the statuary or relics belonged to an Expeditus, and so veneration began. Such an account is set in France in 1781. A case containing the relics of a saint, who was formerly buried in the Denfert-Rochereau catacombs of Paris, was delivered at a convent in the city. The senders had written expédit on the case, to ensure fast delivery of the remains. The nuns assumed that "Expédit" was the name of a martyr, and prayed for his intercession. When their prayers were answered, veneration spread rapidly through France and on to other Roman Catholic countries.

Another version of the story takes place in New Orleans, Louisiana, which was strongly influenced by French Catholic culture through the colonial period.  This account says that Our Lady of Guadalupe Chapel (New Orleans) received a large shipment of statues of various saints, and that one case lacked an identifying label. It was labeled "Expedite" (Expédit in French), so the residents assumed that must be the saint's name. Expédit still figures prominently in Louisiana Creole folklore and is revered through amulets, flowers, candles, and intercessory prayers.

Iconographical depiction 
Expeditus' typical depiction in artwork is as a young Roman centurion. The soldier is squashing a crow beneath his right foot and bearing a clock in early images. Later depictions have Expeditus holding a cross, inscribed with the Latin word hodie ("today"). A banderole with the word cras ("tomorrow" in Latin) emerges from the crow's mouth.

Although in the English language a crow's cry is rendered as "caw caw," in Italian the sound is "cra cra.", and Latin version was "cras cras".

Réunion Island 

Expédit has a significant folk following on the French island of Réunion off the east coast of Africa in the Indian Ocean. Stories about the origin of his veneration follow the typical formula: a mysterious parcel marked with expedit arrived as an aid to instill pious virtues in the people. Another version says that Expédit acquired his name through his help in placing vengeful curses. Decapitated statues of the saint are often found, the defacement inflicted in anger for a request not carried out, or in order to break an existing curse.

Road-side altars dedicated to Expédit can be as small as a box containing a small statue of the saint, or as large as a hut, containing multiple statues, candles, and flowers. In all cases, these altars are painted a bright red. Also common are ex-votos thanking Expédit for wishes granted and favors received.

In Réunion, the cult of Saint Expédit has been syncretic, associating him with goddess Kali, with Roman Catholicism absorbing other beliefs from Madagascar or India. Expédit is a popular saint, revered by Reunionnais regardless of age or religion. As the worship of Expédit is officially considered taboo, people do not generally visit the altars in the open. But, the altars are widespread on the island and obviously well-tended, showing that the cult is active.

Churches in the world 
There are churches dedicated to Expeditus all over the world:

Chile 

Himnos mil al glorioso Expedito,
que su sangre en la Armenia vertió,
cuyo nombre en el cielo fue escrito,
y de mártir el laurel alcanzó.
—Himno a San Expedito

A thousand hymns to glorious Expeditus,
Who shed his blood in Armenia,
Whose name was written in heaven,
And gained the laurel of martyrdom.
—Hymn to Saint Expeditus

Veneration in Chile is said to have begun when a devotee of Expeditus (or locally in Spanish, San Expedito) brought an image of him to Viña del Mar, one of the most popular beach cities of Chile. She petitioned some local priests for help to have a small church built for him. It is said that local authorities initially rejected the idea, but the priests and the devout lady prayed to Expeditus, and in less than nine days they had the approval. Since then, the cult of San Expedito has become increasingly popular in Chile; from rich to poor, people pray novenas to him. The shrine in the Reñaca sector of Viña is a rather popular pilgrimage site, especially during summer.

References

Further reading 
  A booklet that contains a prayer and novena litany to Expedit.

External links 
 
 San Expeditus Site
 San Expeditus Web

3rd-century births
303 deaths
Religion in Réunion
4th-century Christian martyrs
4th-century Romans
Christians martyred during the reign of Diocletian